Tiffany Lynn Alvord (born December 11, 1992) is an American singer, songwriter and actress. She has been cited as one of YouTube's first "home-grown celebrities". She has a large social presence on YouTube with over 705 million video views and over 3.15 million subscribers. Alvord also has a strong following on social media sites including more than 2.6 million Facebook fans and over 350 thousand Twitter followers. In December 2012, Alvord performed in Times Square on the Nivea stage with Carly Rae Jepsen, Train, PSY and Taylor Swift as part of the 2012 New Year's Eve celebration.

Biography
Alvord was born December 11, 1992, in California, the daughter of Cherie Alvord, who works as her manager. She is the second youngest of seven siblings, having six brothers. When in elementary school, Alvord learned to play the piano and wrote her first songs by age ten. At the age of 14, she taught herself to play the guitar, her second musical instrument. The following year, in April 2008, at 15, she published her first song on YouTube. Alvord was raised Mormon, but now identifies as simply 'Christian.'

Alvord trained as a gymnast for nine years, and spent four years competing until a sport-ending injury during competition. She finished high school in 2010, taking three years. Alvord postponed college to focus on her music.

Musical career

Alvord's career includes performances in Canada, England, China, Singapore, Thailand, Indonesia, Malaysia, and the Philippines. She opened for Boyce Avenue on their U.S. tour during February and March 2011, and headlined with Alex Goot on a U.S. tour between August and September of the same year.

In June 2012, Alvord took first place in an ArtistSignal competition, winning a $25,000 grand prize. Then on June 29, 2012, she released her third album, I've Got It Covered Vol. 2, which, like her first album, has 10 cover songs made popular on her YouTube channel. On September 18, 2012, Alvord released her fourth album on iTunes, entitled My Heart Is. In December 2012, Alvord performed in Times Square on the Nivea stage with Carly Rae Jepsen, Train, PSY and Taylor Swift as part of the 2012 New Year's Eve celebration.

Alvord headlined a tour in four different countries in Southeast Asia during March 2013, and co-headlined a West Coast tour of the U.S. in April 2013 with fellow YouTube star Jason Chen. In July 2013, Alvord performed live in Europe for the first time, headlining sold-out shows in London, including the historic London Hippodrome. During the trip, Alvord was featured on a live interview with Simon Lederman on 94.9 BBC Radio, London.

On August 13, 2013, she released her fifth album, I’ve Got It Covered Vol. 3. The next year Alvord released her Legacy album, on August 12, 2014.

Alvord has been covered by numerous print and online publications, including The Wall Street Journal, The New York Times, Fortune magazine, Alternative Press magazine, Ora TV, Empty Lighthouse Magazine, AdWeek, Yareah magazine, and AOL On.

Acting career
In 2017, Alvord made her acting debut in the first season of the teen drama web series Guilty Party as Emma Wilson, as well as the adventure comedy film School Spirits. In 2018, Alvord returned in the second season of Guilty Party as a different character, Harper Vince.

Discography

Original Music

Cover albums

Filmography

References

External links
 
 

1992 births
American women singer-songwriters
Living people
American film actresses
21st-century American actresses
21st-century American women singers
21st-century American singers
Singer-songwriters from California
Latter Day Saints from California
YouTubers from California